was a Samurai in the early Edo period of Japan. He was involved in the revenge of the Forty-seven rōnin incident (also known as the Akō incident) as one of the rōnin. Takashige was originally a subordinate of the daimyō Asano Naganori, master of Akō Domain.

Early life 
Takashige was born in Akō in 1672. His family was originally from Hangzhou, Zhejiang, China. His only brother was Takebayashi Tadataka. His grandfather Watanabe Kotonori was a Ming dynasty soldier. After he was captured by the Japanese forces during the Japanese invasions of Korea, Kotonori settled down in the Hiroshima domain where he served the Mōri clan as a physician. Later, the family moved to Akō domain. Takashige's surname Takebayashi is an alternative and indigenous name of Hangzhou.

Samurai 
The master of Akō domain Asano Naganori was involved in a quarrel with another daimyō Kira Yoshihisa when they were having an audience with the Tokugawa shōgun. Naganori injured Yoshihisa with his katana. This was seen as an irreverence by the shogunate. Naganori received the penalty of Seppuku and died. The incident left  Takashige unemployed with great shame.

After accepting Ōishi Yoshio's invitation, Takashige joined the squad of vendetta that sought the head of Kira Yoshihisa. Takeshige was affiliated with the front door squad and broke into Yoshihisa's house. Later he found an old man with white hair hiding. They identified the scar of this man as the scar left by Naganori. Takashige finished Yoshihisa's life with his katana after Hazama Mitsuoki stabbed the victim with a spear. 

The head of Yoshihisa was decapitated. Takashige and the other ronins presented his head in front of the tomb of Naganori in order to declare their success to their master.

Takashige received the seppuku sentence in the year of 1703. He was 32 years old when he died.

Kabuki plays
Samurai
Suicides by seppuku
1672 births
1703 deaths